Harold John Gainger (23 June 1909 – 11 March 1988) was an Australian rules footballer who played with St Kilda in the Victorian Football League (VFL).

Career
Gainger, who was originally from Beeac, had already spent a season as captain-coach of Terang, before coming to St Kilda in 1934.

Described by former Geelong coach Lloyd Hagger as "one of the best ruck men in the Western District", Gainger also played at centre half-forward. He played 14 of a possible 18 games for St Kilda in the 1934 season and looked to leave the club the following year to coach Mortlake, but was unable to get a clearance. Remaining at St Kilda, Gainger played seven league games that year, then only four in 1936.

In 1937, Gainger went to Victorian Football Association club Sandringham, where he played for two seasons.

References

External links

1909 births
Australian rules footballers from Victoria (Australia)
St Kilda Football Club players
Sandringham Football Club players
Terang Football Club players
Terang Football Club coaches
1988 deaths